Libby Bance (born 23 July 2003) is an English professional footballer who plays as a midfielder for Women Super League club Brighton & Hove Albion.

Club career 
After rising through the Brighton Academy, Bance made her senior debut on 20 November 2019 against London Bees in the League cup in a 5–0 win. In October 2020, Bance came on in added time for her league debut in a 1–0 win against West Ham. Bance Signed a two-year professional contract with Brighton in August 2021.

Personal life 
Bance is currently studying at Reigate College and is studying A-Levels in PE, History and Applied Human Biology.

Career statistics

Club 
.

References

External links 
 Libby Bance at Soccerway

Living people
Women's Super League players
Brighton & Hove Albion W.F.C. players
English women's footballers
Women's association football forwards
2003 births